"Asking Us to Dance" is a song recorded by American country music artist Kathy Mattea. It was released in October 1991 as the third single from the album Time Passes By. The song reached #27 on the Billboard Hot Country Singles & Tracks chart. The song was written by Hugh Prestwood.

Chart performance

References

Songs about dancing
1991 singles
1991 songs
Kathy Mattea songs
Songs written by Hugh Prestwood
Song recordings produced by Allen Reynolds
Mercury Records singles